Bisaurri, in Benasquese: Bisaúrri ) or in Aragonese: Bisagorri, is a municipality located in the province of Huesca, Aragon, Spain. According to the 2004 census (INE), the municipality has a population of 248 inhabitants.

Near modern Bisaurri is a cave known as Els Trocs, which is a significant archaeological site, dating from the Neolithic era.

References

Municipalities in the Province of Huesca
Ribagorza